The 1926–27 season was Manchester United's 31st season in the Football League.

During the season on 7 October 1926, The Football Association announced that United manager John Chapman had been suspended from "taking part in football or football management for improper conduct in his position as Secretary-Manager of the Manchester United Football Club". No further explanation for the suspension was ever given. By the next match, two days later against Bolton Wanderers, Lal Hilditch had taken over on a temporary basis as player-manager. Hilditch managed the team until 13 April 1927 when Herbert Bamlett appointed as the new United manager.

First Division

FA Cup

References

Manchester United F.C. seasons
Manchester United